The UK Singles Chart is the official record chart in the United Kingdom. Prior to 1969 there was no official singles chart; however, The Official Charts Company and Guinness' British Hit Singles & Albums regard the canonical sources as New Musical Express (NME) before 10 March 1960 and Record Retailer from then until 15 February 1969 when Retailer and the BBC jointly commissioned the British Market Research Bureau (BMRB) to compile the charts. The choice to use Record Retailer as the canonical source for the 1960s has been contentious because NME (which continued compiling charts beyond March 1960) had the biggest circulation of periodicals in the decade and was more widely followed. As well as the chart compilers mentioned previously, Melody Maker, Disc and Record Mirror all compiled their own charts during the decade. Due to the lack of any official chart the BBC aggregated results from all these charts to announce its own Pick of the Pops chart. One source explains that the reason for using the Record Retailer chart for the 1960s was that it was "the only chart to have as many as 50 positions for almost the entire decade". The sample size of Record Retailer in the early 1960s was around 30 stores whereas NME and Melody Maker were sampling over 100 stores. In 1969, the first BMRB chart was compiled using postal returns of sales logs from 250 record shops.

In terms of number-one singles, The Beatles were the most successful group of the decade having seventeen singles reach the top spot. The longest duration of a single at number-one was eight weeks and this was achieved on three occasions: "It's Now or Never" by Elvis Presley in 1960; "Wonderful Land" by The Shadows in 1962 and "Sugar, Sugar" by The Archies in 1969. The Beatles' song "She Loves You" became the best-selling single of all time in 1963, a record it held until 1977 when band member Paul McCartney's new band, Wings, surpassed it with "Mull of Kintyre". "She Loves You" was the best-selling song of the decade and one of fourteen songs believed to have sold over one million copies in the 1960s.

Number-one singles

By artist
The following artists achieved three or more number-one hits during the 1960s.

By record label
The following record labels had five or more number ones on the UK Singles Chart during the 1960s.

Million-selling and gold records
Although official music recording sales certifications were not introduced until the British Phonographic Industry was formed in 1973, Disc introduced an initiative in 1959 to present a gold record to singles that sold over one million units. Information about when a record was classified gold by Disc is "not well documented". The awards relied on record companies correctly compiling and supplying sales information. This could lead to errors, such as The Archies' "Sugar, Sugar" incorrectly being awarded a gold disc in January 1970. Such inaccuracies led to the instigation of official classifications by the BPI. Nevertheless, following the introduction of music downloads in 2004, "Sugar, Sugar" passed the one-million sales mark.

The Shadows instrumental, "Apache", is the first known song to being awarded Discs gold record but it is disputed whether one million copies were sold. The awarding of fifteen gold records (one erroneously) is documented and, notably, five were awarded to releases by The Beatles. No song is believed to have sold one million copies after 1967 – "The Last Waltz" by Engelbert Humperdinck – and before BPI instigated its platinum record (still one million units) in 1973. Although The Righteous Brothers first released "Unchained Melody" in August 1965 it had more success after being re-released in the 1990s reaching number one and selling over one million copies.

Notes

References

Further reading
 Davis, Sharon. Every Chart-Topper Tells a Story: The Sixties. Edinburgh: Mainstream Publishing, 1997 , 288p.

External links
 Archive of all UK Number One Singles of the 1960s with images of original packaging

1960s
1960s in British music